Chancellor is a hybrid wine grape variety produced by Albert Seibel c. 1860. It is also known as Seibel 7053 and is a cross of Seibel 5163 and Seibel 880.

The grape produces a fruity red wine. It is susceptible to both downy and powdery mildew.

Synonyms
Chancellor is also known under the synonyms or breeding codes S 70-53, S-7053, Seibel 70-53, and Seibel 7053.

References

Red wine grape varieties
Seibel grapes